Teodor Ilincăi (born 1983) is a Romanian opera tenor.

Biography 
Born in Mălini, Suceava County, he studied oboe in primary school at the Arts High School in Suceava. After he graduated the theoretical high school “Constantin Brâncoveanu” in Bucharest in 2001 (Philology section), he attended the University of Bucharest's Faculty of Music (Byzantine music), graduating in 2006. Also, while in college, Ilincăi was hired by the Bucharest National Opera's choir and receives his first small roles.

Beginning with 2006, he started singing at the Romanian National Opera, Bucharest, where he made his debut in "Puss in Boots" by Cornel Trăilescu, as Ionică. During his stay here, he took part in several masterclasses held by soprano Leontina Văduva (2007), mezzo Viorica Cortez (2008) and baritone Eduard Tumagian (2010).

In 2008 Ilincăi was invited by the "Banatul" Philharmonics in Timișoara for Stabat Mater by Gioachino Rossini, making his debut in a vocal-symphonic work. In the same year he also appears for the first time on the stage of the Bucharest Romanian Athenaeum in Antonín Dvořák's Requiem and made his debut with the tenor's part in Carmina Burana (Orff) at the Bucharest Opera House and Radio Concert Hall.

His international debut took place in January 2009 at the Hamburg State Opera (MacDuff in Giuseppe Verdi's Macbeth). In March 2009, he made his debut at the Vienna State Opera (Ismaele in Verdi's Nabucco). His debut in Puccini’s La bohème in Timișoara, Bucharest, and Hannover followed. In December 2009, he made his debut at Royal Opera House in London with La Bohème, under John Copley’s stage direction.

In 2011 Ilincăi performed alongside Angela Gheorghiu in a concert in Valladolid, Spain.

Prizes 
 First place in the Tenor’s competition in Szczecin – Poland (2008)
 Soloist of the year offered by Bucharest VIP Gala Awards (2009)
 Ludovic Spiess prize, awarded  by Romanian Music Forum (2009)
 In memoriam Iosif Sava distinction for his activity in 2009, offered by Radio România Cultural (2010)
 Second place at the "Francisco Viñas" international singing competition - Barcelona (2010)

Repertoire 
 Pinkerton – Madama Butterfly
 Lensky – Eugene Onegin
 Ismaele – Nabuco
 Faust – Faust
 Rodolfo – La bohème
 Romeo – Roméo et Juliette
 Alfredo – La traviata
 MacDuff – Macbeth
 Tebaldo – I Capuleti e i Montecchi
 Cassio – Otello
 Calaf – Turandot

Discography 
Giacomo Puccini – La bohème (Royal Opera House 2010), DVD  and Blu-ray

References

External links

Teodor Ilincăi (Facebook Account)

1983 births
Living people
People from Suceava County
Romanian operatic tenors
21st-century Romanian male opera singers
University of Bucharest alumni